Clarenceville School District is a school district headquartered in Livonia, Michigan, in the Detroit metropolitan area. Founded in 1837, it serves portions of Livonia, Farmington Hills, and Redford. As of 2006, the district has approximately 1940 students, 271 teachers/staff and 10 bus drivers. Schools in the district are Clarenceville High School, Clarenceville Middle School, Botsford Elementary and Grandview Elementary.

Overview

According to the Michigan Department of Education, the average Composite ACT score for the class of 2009 in the Clarenceville school district was 18, and the class of 2008's average was 17.  Comparatively, the nearby school districts of Livonia and Farmington had ACT average scores of 21 and 21 in 2009.
The ratio of students per teacher is 21 to 1, and as of the 2009 MME results, students are 47% at or above the proficiency level for Reading, 75% at or above the proficiency level for Social Studies, 43% at or above the proficiency level for Science, 37% at or above the proficiency level for Writing, and 35% at or above the proficiency level for Math.  The state average for the MME test in 2009 was 60% for Reading, 81% for Social Studies, 56% for Science, 43% for Writing, and 49% for Math.

All of the buildings have received the highest level of accreditation provided by the North Central Association of Colleges and Schools, as well as adequate yearly progress.

Louis E. Schmidt Auditorium 
Clarenceville High School shares a Michigan historical marker with its adjoined 919-person auditorium, constructed in 1968 and named for a longtime school superintendent and Michigan House Representative.

The auditorium's history as a major music venue began with the Clarenceville Jazz Series, run by Detroit jazz maven Midge Ellis from 1969 to 1982. During that time, such acts as Buddy Rich, Stan Kenton, Woody Herman, Harry James, Gene Krupa, Lionel Hampton, and Maynard Ferguson performed and conducted workshops for students at the high school. The Clarenceville Jazz Band program continued until just a few years before Ellis' death at the age of 91, in 2015.

Athletics
The nickname of Clarenceville Middle and High School's sports teams are the Trojans.

Students of the Clarenceville School District are considered Livonia residents for the purposes of the Livonia Hockey Association whether or not they and their families live within the city limits of Livonia, MI.

Etymology 
The school district's name was derived from the former town of Clarenceville which took up some territory in Farmington Hills.  It is believed that since the town of Clarenceville was in Oakland County, the school district is listed as being in that county despite having its schools in Wayne County.  Two former elementary schools, Edgewood Elementary and Westbrook Elementary, were located in Farmington Hills, Oakland County, but were closed in the 1970s. The school also owns a parking lot where it stores its buses that is in Oakland County.

Notable alumni
Timothy Shaw, former NFL linebacker for four teams
Serena Shim, journalism and war correspondent for Press TV

References

External links 

http://www.clarenceville.k12.mi.us
http://www.clarencevilleathletics.com

Education in Wayne County, Michigan
Livonia, Michigan
Farmington Hills, Michigan
School districts established in 1837
Education in Oakland County, Michigan
1837 establishments in Michigan
School districts in Michigan